Anthony Calf (born 4 May 1959) is an English actor. He studied acting at the London Academy of Music and Dramatic Art (LAMDA). He has recurring roles in the television medical drama Holby City, as Michael Beauchamp, and New Tricks as DAC Robert Strickland. He has also worked in theatre, where his credits include productions of The Madness of George III with the National Theatre and A Midsummer Night's Dream, The false servant at the National Theatre and Rock'n Roll at the Duke of York's Theatre. He was nominated as best actor in the Irish Times Theatre Awards 2008 for his work in Uncle Vanya at the Gate Theatre. He was featured in King Charles III on Broadway in 2015.

Career
He made his television debut in the 1982 Doctor Who episode The Visitation, he returned to the series 35 years later in the 2017 episode "Empress of Mars". Also in 1982, he landed the role of Digby Geste in a television adaptation of Beau Geste. His other television credits include the part of novelist Lawrence Durrell in My Family and Other Animals (1987), Pip in Great Expectations and Colonel Fitzwilliam in the 1995 BBC adaptation of Pride and Prejudice as well as Tom Faggus in the BBC adaptation of Lorna Doone. He has also appeared in episodes of Doc Martin, Foyle's War, Midsomer Murders and Agatha Christie's Poirot.

In 2010, Calf played the Foreign Secretary Anthony Eden in the BBC's revival of Upstairs, Downstairs, reprising his stage role as Eden (twenty years older as Prime Minister at the time of Suez) in Howard Brenton's Never So Good (2008). In 2019 he played William Wickham, founder of the British foreign secret service, in some episodes of Poldark, series 5.

Personal life
He is married to the actress Caroline Harker, with whom he has three daughters.

Selected film television and theatre roles

Television credits include:
Poldark (2019) – as William Wickham
King Lear (2018) – as Duke of Albany
Midsomer Murders “The Village That Rose From The Dead” (2016) – as Julian Lennard
Dracula (2013) – as Dr William Murray
New Tricks (2005–15) – as DAC Robert Strickland
Restless (2012) – as Gerald Laird
Call the Midwife (2012) – as Mr. Tracey
Upstairs Downstairs (2011) – as Anthony Eden
Identity (2010) – as Max
Lewis (2010) – as Malcom Finneston
Material Girl (2010) – as Anthony Chatsworth
Trinity (2009) – as Lord Ravensby
Doc Martin (2009) – as Richard Wenn
Mistresses (2008) – as John
Dalziel and Pascoe (2007) – as Joe Furst
The Good Samaritan (2007) – as Michael Ambley
Holby City (2005–06) – as Michael Beauchamp
Tom's Christmas Tree  (2006) – Officer
The Impressionists  (2006) – as Émile Zola
Beau Brummell: This Charming Man  (2006) – as Frederick, Duke of York
The Strange Case of Sherlock Holmes & Arthur Conan Doyle  (2006) – as Bryan Charles Walker
The Robinsons  (2005) – as Peter
Amnesia  (2004) – as John Deen
The Murder Room  (2004) – as Lord Martlesham
Indian Dream (2003) – as David
The Brides in the Bath  (2003) – as Howard Munday
Judge John Deed, 2 episodes (2003) – as James Brooklands
Doc Martin and the Legend of the Cloutie (2003) – as Tim Bowden
Lucky Jim  (2003) – as Cecil Goldsmith
Sirens (2002) – as Anthony Soames
Foyle's War, 1 episode (2002) – as Wing Commander Martin Keller
The Inspector Lynley Mysteries: A Great Deliverance – as Simon St James
Lorna Doone  (2000) – as Tom Faggus
Midsomer Murders “Dead Man's Eleven” (1999) – as Stephen Cavendish
Our Mutual Friend  (1998) – as Alfred Lammle
Kavanagh QC, Mute of Malice  (1997) – as Miles Beddoes
A Touch of Frost, True Confessions  (1997) – as James Barr
Pride and Prejudice  (1995) TV Mini-Series - as Colonel Fitzwilliam
Bramwell  (1995) – as Andrew Armstrong
Riders (1993) – as Billy Lloyd-Foxe
Agatha Christie's Poirot - The Mysterious Affair at Styles (1990) – Lawrence Cavendish
Great Expectations (1989) TV Mini-Series - as Pip
Tanamera - Lion of Singapore (1989) – as Tim Dexter
My Family and Other Animals (1987) – as Lawrence Durrell
Fortunes of War (1987) – as Cpl. Arnold
Beau Geste (1982) – as Digby Geste
Doctor Who, The Visitation (1982) – as Charles

Film credits include:
 The Children Act (2017) – as Mark Berner
 The Man Who knew Infinity (2015) – as Howard
Straightheads  (2007) – as Heffer
Dead Cool  (2004) – as Mark
Fairy Tale: a True Story  (1997) – as Hodson
A woman of the North  (1997) – as Hugo
Anna Karenina  (1997) – as Serpuliovskoy
The Madness of King George   (1994) – as Fitzroy
Great Expectations (1989) as Pip
Oxford Blues (1984) – as Gareth Rycroft

Theatre credits include:
 Twelfth Night (2017) – as Malvolio at the Royal Exchange, Manchester
 The Hard Problem (2015)
Stephen Ward the Musical (2013–2014)
Private Lives (2013)
My Fair Lady (2012–13)
Private Lives  (2012)
Death and the Maiden  (2011)
The Deep Blue Sea  (2011)
Les Parents Terribles  (2011)
The White Guard  (2010)
The Power of Yes  (2009–10)
Wallenstein (play)  (2009)
Gethsemane (play)  (2008–09)
Never So Good (play)  (2008)
Uncle Vanya  (2007)
Rock'n Roll  (2006)
The False Servant  (2005)
The Hotel in Amsterdam  (2003)
A Buyer's Market  (2002)
Cressida  (2000)
Dolly West's Kitchen  (2000)
Betrayal  (1998)
Neverland
Cracked
My Night with Reg
The Madness of George III
Green Fingers
Another Country
Filumena
She Stoops to Conquer
The Boy Friend
A Midsummer Night's Dream

External links
 
 Actor Bio at www.bbc.co.uk
 

English male television actors
Alumni of the London Academy of Music and Dramatic Art
1959 births
Living people
People from Hammersmith
Male actors from London
20th-century English male actors
21st-century English male actors
English male film actors
English male stage actors